This is a list of busiest cruise ports by passengers. Some Asian ports are not included due to lack of information.

References

Busiest cruise ports by passengers